Bulbophyllum habrotinum is a species of orchid in the genus Bulbophyllum.
It is found on lightly shaded tree limbs in the warm, 600–800 meter elevation forests of Borneo. It produces 4" long flowers.

References
The Bulbophyllum-Checklist
The Internet Orchid Species Photo Encyclopedia

External links 

 

habrotinum